Battle of Qurna was a battle during the Iraq War between the Multinational force in Iraq and Iraqi insurgents. The battle took part in Al-Qurna. In the battle, the insurgents tried to take the control of the city from the allies, mainly Danish, Lithuanian and British soldiers. The insurgents were later forced to retreat.

Aftermath
The main fighting element in the battle was the Lithuanian Mechanized Infantry Platoon.
After the battle, the allies took control of Qurna. The Danish soldier, Sergeant Ole Gretlund was awarded The Defence Medal for saving the lives of the Lithuanian soldiers.

Battles of the Iraq War in 2005
Battles of the Iraq War involving the United Kingdom
Battles of the Iraq War involving Denmark
Iraqi insurgency (2003–2011)
May 2005 events in Iraq